Toomas Alatalu (born 23 August 1942 in Rakvere) is an Estonian historian, educator, political commentator and politician. He has been member of VII, VIII and X Riigikogu.

From 1999 until 2005 he belonged to the Estonian Centre Party. From 2005 until 2009, he was a member of the People's Union of Estonia party. Between 2009 and 2018, he was a member of the Social Democratic Party.

References

1942 births
Living people
20th-century Estonian historians
Estonian Centre Party politicians
People's Union of Estonia politicians
Social Democratic Party (Estonia) politicians
Members of the Riigikogu, 1995–1999
Members of the Riigikogu, 2003–2007
Recipients of the Order of the White Star, 4th Class
University of Tartu alumni
Academic staff of the University of Tartu
People from Rakvere
Members of the Riigikogu, 1992–1995